Boyette Slave House is a historic home located near Kenly, Johnston County, North Carolina.  It is a small one-room log dwelling.  It is built of hewn and pit-sawn plans and features a gable end stick and mud chimney.  The building measures 16 feet by 12 feet and 8 feet tall. Between 1890 and 1910 it was reused as a schoolhouse.

It was listed on the National Register of Historic Places in 1979. The site of the Boyette Plantation House across the street is not listed.

References

External links
Boyette Slave and Schoolhouse (Visit NC)
Boyette Slave and Schoolhouse (Johnston County Visitor's Bureau)
Boyette Slave House & Slavery in 19th Century Eastern North Carolina (Beth Navarez Historical Consulting)

African-American history of North Carolina
Houses on the National Register of Historic Places in North Carolina
Houses in Johnston County, North Carolina
National Register of Historic Places in Johnston County, North Carolina